Cathleen Großmann (born Cathleen Rund, 3 November 1977 in Berlin), formerly called Cathleen Stolze, is a former backstroke and medley swimmer from Germany, who competed at two consecutive Summer Olympics for her native country, starting in 1996 in Atlanta, Georgia. There she won the bronze medal in the 200 m backstroke. Rund retired from international competition after the Sydney Olympics in 2000. In 2004, she moved to Frankfurt to work as a swimming trainer.

Private life
Cathleen Großmann is the daughter of former East German Olympians Evelyn Stolze (swimming) and Peter Rund (water polo), and changed her name back from Stolze to Rund when they remarried in 1993. She attended the Werner-Seelenbinder-Schule, before studying sport at the Humboldt University of Berlin.

References

External links
 
 
 

1977 births
Living people
German female swimmers
German female medley swimmers
German female backstroke swimmers
Olympic swimmers of Germany
Swimmers at the 1996 Summer Olympics
Swimmers at the 2000 Summer Olympics
Swimmers from Berlin
Olympic bronze medalists for Germany
Humboldt University of Berlin alumni
Olympic bronze medalists in swimming
Medalists at the FINA World Swimming Championships (25 m)
European Aquatics Championships medalists in swimming
Medalists at the 1996 Summer Olympics
20th-century German women
21st-century German women